This was a new event in the ITF Women's Circuit.

Wildcards Nicole Gibbs and Vania King won the title, defeating Julia Glushko and Rebecca Peterson in the final, 6–4, 6–4.

Seeds

Draw

References 
 Draw

Waco Showdown - Doubles